Taiba (foaled April 13, 2019) is an American Thoroughbred racehorse who has won multiple Grade I events as a three-year-old in 2022 including the Santa Anita Derby and Malibu Stakes at Santa Anita Park and Pennsylvania Derby at Parx Racing.

Background
Taiba is a chestnut colt that was bred in Kentucky by Bruce Ryan who has been breeding and raising horses for more than 30 years. The founder of Ryan's All-Glass, a commercial custom glass company in Cincinnati, started out with Quarter Horses but soon discovered he had better opportunities to make money with Thoroughbreds.

His sire is Gun Runner, the 2017 American Horse of the Year and stands at Three Chimneys Farm and his dam is Needmore Flattery, a daughter of Flatter that won nine black-type stakes on her way to earning $732,103. Her granddam Kiosk, was from Eutrophia Farms at the 2001 Ohio Thoroughbred Breeders and Owners Fall Mixed Sale after she was bought back on a final bid of $6,700. Kiosk became a five-time stakes-placed winner of $115,649. She has produced eight winners from eight to race including Needmore Flattery.

Zach Madden consigned the colt as a yearling for Bruce Ryan at the 2020 Fasig-Tipton Kentucky October Yearling Sale where longtime partners Randy Hartley and Dean De Renzo bought him for $140,000. Hartley and De Renzo then pinhooked Taiba to the 2021 Fasig-Tipton Gulfstream Sale of select two-year-olds in training, selling him for $1.7 million to agent Gary Young for Zedan Racing Stables.

Taiba was initially trained by Bob Baffert but after his maiden win his owners considered the horse a possibility to run in the Kentucky Derby they moved the horse to Tim Yakteen for his second start in the Santa Anita Derby so as to obtain qualification points to garner a start in the event. Yakteen took over the training of Taiba, not long before their previous trainer, Bob Baffert, began serving a 90-day suspension stemming from Medina Spirit's positive test after last year's Kentucky Derby. Churchill Downs in 2021 announced that no horses in Baffert's care would be eligible to earn points on the Road to the Kentucky Derby.

After completing in the Kentucky Derby, in June Taiba returned to Bob Baffert's stable.

Career

2022: Three-year-old season
Taiba made his debut on March 5 in a Maiden Special Weight event over 6 furlongs at Santa Anita. Starting as the 1/2 odds-on favorite, he dueled for command up the backstretch, vying with Mauritius and Magicnthemoonlight while along the rail on the turn, then inched ahead with a quarter-mile remaining, shaking free at the top of the stretch and powering away to a -length victory in a fast time of 1:09.97.

One month later, owner Amr Zedan, jumped the colt from his six-furlong maiden victory to the Grade 1 Santa Anita Derby event over the -mile distance. Trainer Tim Yakteen said a few days before the race that it was "going to be a bit of an ask" for the chestnut colt to win. Yakteen also said that Taiba had been training forwardly and that "he has impressed very much in the morning." Veteran jockey Mike Smith picked up the mount after John Velazquez chose to ride stablemate Messier. Taiba started well and was in range of leaders Forbidden Kingdom and Messier early, then ranged up three wide to challenge in the stretch. Taiba caught Messier approaching the final sixteenth and drew off for the win, stopping the timer in 1:48.46. With the win, Taiba gained enough qualification points to start in the Kentucky Derby.

In the Kentucky Derby, Taiba was no factor and finished twelfth in a field of twenty, beaten by nearly 18 lengths to longshot Rich Strike.

After a ten-week break, Taiba started in the Grade 1 Haskell Stakes at Monmouth Park. He battled with Arkansas Derby winner Cyberknife through the straight to come up short by a head in a track-record time of 1:46.24 for the -mile distance. Trainer Bob Baffert said, "Mike (Smith) had him in a spot to win and we just came up short. Cyberknife got a great trip. (Taiba) was stuck down there and he was not happy being stuck behind horses. I was really worried at about the three-eighths pole. Mike said that when he got him out in the clear, he just kicked in."

After resting the colt on the West Coast, Baffert brought him out on September 24 to Parx Racing near Philadelphia for the Grade 1 Pennsylvania Derby against a field of three-year-olds that included Cyberknife, GI Blue Grass Stakes winner Zandon, and recently third in the GI Travers Stakes and GII West Virginia Derby winner Skippylongstockin. As the 7/5 favorite, Taiba posted a three-length victory over Zandon with Cyberknife in third, nearly four more lengths away, in a time of 1:48.67. After winning the event for the fourth time, Baffert said, "It was a tough race, a good field. The main thing is that he ran his race. Lately he has been very willing. I can see the improvement. Today was his day. I really think he is starting to figure it out."

Taiba finished third to Flightline in the 2022 Breeders' Cup Classic at Keeneland Racecourse.

On opening day of the Santa Anita Park's 2022–23 Winter-Sprint meeting, Taiba ran in the Grade 1 Malibu Stakes. Starting as the 2/5 odds-on favorite in the seven furlong sprint for three-year-olds, Taiba ridden by jockey Mike E. Smith started weell and followed leader Forbidden Kingdom. When Taiba reached the top of the stretch, it appeared that maybe he wouldn't have the punch he needed, but that was an illusion. Taiba kicked in, pulling alongside Forbidden Kingdom, and then drew away to score by  lengths in 1:21.75. Forbidden Kingdom finished three-quarters of a length in front of third-place Hoist the Gold.

Statistics

An (*) asterisk after the odds means Taiba was the post-time favorite.

Pedigree

References

2019 racehorse births
Racehorses bred in Kentucky
Racehorses trained in the United States
Thoroughbred family 8-j
American Grade 1 Stakes winners